Shahrake Hor (also Romanized as Shahrake Hor ) is a village in Sar Joulaki Rural District, Joulaki District, Aghajari County, Khuzestan Province, Iran. At the 2011 census, its population was 1,121, in 241 families.

References 

Populated places in Aghajari County